Strano il mio destino (Live & studio 95/96) is the first studio/live album by Giorgia. As the title indicates, the album is composed of a mix of live tracks, recorded on her Tour Teatrale during her Rome leg in 1995, as well as tracks recorded in the studio. The album was released under the BMG label at the beginning of 1996, directly after her third consecutive appearance at the Sanremo, with the title track "Strano il mio destino" placing 3rd, after winning the competition the previous year with the track "Come Saprei".

Development 

Opening the album is the title track Strano il mio destino, written by Giorgia together with the famous Italian lyricist Maurizio Fabrizio. The album's was produced entirely by "La Coccinella s.r.l." (which would later become "Dischi di Cioccolata s.r.l."). The final track contains a remix of E c'è ancora mare, one of the most well known of Giorgia's songs (together with Come saprei from her previous album "Come Thelma & Louise"), which was created in the studio, and was produced and arranged by Celso Valli with the artistic production of Michele Torpedine. This remix was described as a "Pulp Beat Version", where the term "pulp" actually refers to the recording studio where it was made, and not as a new genre of music as is widely believed.

The remaining five songs composing the central tracks of the album, originate from her concerts during her concert tour of Italy in 1995. At this point in her career Giorgia had become even more well-known. She had sung with Luciano Pavarotti on his album Pavarotti and friends, and also sang at the concert held in the Vatican, which included Pope John Paul II in the audience. She also released a single, "Vivo per lei" with Andrea Bocelli, who had also sung at the San Remo festival, winning the New Artists category, the same year as Giorgia had sung with her hit "E poi".

Giorgia was involved in the composition and vocal arrangements of the tracks, entering a more mature phase of her career, thanks to the initial encouragement of Pino Daniele, which she would continue into her following album Mangio Troppo Cioccolata.

Track listing

Personnel 

 Giorgia – vocals tracks 1–7; vocal arrangement tracks 1–6
 Massimo Carpani – sound recording track 1 at Studi Fonoprint, Bologna
 Luca Bignardi – recording, mixing track 1, recording vocal track 7 @ Studi Fonoprint, Bologna
 Alfredo Golino – drums track 1
 Cesare Chiodo – bass track 1
 Luca Orioli – sound programming and computer track 1
 Celso Valli – acoustic piano, keyboards track 1; production, arrangements tracks 1 and 7
 Michele Torpedine – artistic production track 1 and 7; manager tracks 2–6
 La Coccinella s.r.l. – production tracks 1–7
 Luca Cersosimo, Enrico La Falce – remix track 7 at Multiart Centre «Pulp» Studio, Milano
 D'Alessandro & Galli – live tour production 1995
 Michael Baker – rums, vocals tracks 2–6 (duet in track 3)
 Rickey Minor – bass, musical direction tracks 2–6
 Vernon «Ice» Black – electric guitar, folk guitar tracks 2–6
 Mark Swenson – Acoustic guitar tracks 1, 4–5 Guitar arrangements
 Fabrizio Capecchi/Fabio Canzian/ electric guitar
 James Raymond – keyboards tracks 2–6
 Rosario Giuliani – alto sax track 6
 Pattie Howard, Angela Baggi – backing vocals
 Olivia McClurkin – backing vocals tracks 2, 4–6 and vocals track 3
 John Ryan – sound technician tracks 2–6 from FOH L&R
 Serse Man – editing and mastering
 Stefano Steo Zacchi for Showbiz Arts & Graphics, Bologna – artistic direction and design
 Laura Camia – photography
 Steve – live photography
 Maria Laura Antonelli – photography (back cover)
 Luciano Squeo – makeup
 Rino Balducci – hair

Charts

References 

Giorgia (singer) albums
1996 albums
1996 live albums